Glycoprotein hormones, alpha polypeptide is a protein that in humans is encoded by the CGA gene.

The gonadotropin hormones, human chorionic gonadotropin (hCG), luteinizing hormone (LH), follicle-stimulating hormone (FSH), and thyroid-stimulating hormone (TSH) are heterodimers consisting of alpha and beta subunits (also called chains) that are associated non-covalently. The alpha subunits of these four human glycoprotein hormones are identical; however, their beta chains are unique and confer biological specificity. The protein encoded by this gene is the alpha subunit and belongs to the glycoprotein hormones alpha chain family.

References

Further reading